Hancockia is a genus of the orchid family (Orchidaceae). There is only one known species, Hancockia uniflora, native to eastern Asia (Japan including Ryukyu Islands, Vietnam, Yunnan, Taiwan)

References

External links 

Collabieae
Monotypic Epidendroideae genera
Collabieae genera
Orchids of Asia